Ten Thirty-One Pictures Entertainment is an American film production company. The company was founded by producer Levi Obery in 2002 and is best known for producing the films The Only Way, Into the Woods, the award-winning documentary on Obery Farms, and One of the Good Ones, the upcoming film from Jesy McKinney and Chase Tarca.

Filmography

References

External links
 Official website

Mass media companies established in 2002
Film production companies of the United States
Companies based in Los Angeles County, California
Companies based in Woodford County, Illinois
2002 establishments in Illinois